"Deal Me Out" was the 37th episode of the M*A*S*H television series and the thirteenth of season two. The episode aired on December 8, 1973.

Plot
Captain Sam Pak (Pat Morita) and Major Sidney Freedman (Allan Arbus) arrive at the 4077th for a "conference" that is actually a marathon poker game in the Swamp, also attended by Henry Blake, Hawkeye, Trapper, and Klinger. The game is interrupted several times during the night.

Radar pulls Henry aside with news that he has struck a local resident while driving a jeep. The man is taken to Post-Op and later threatens to report Radar to the MP's unless he receives $50. From Radar's description, Pak recognizes him as "Whiplash" Hwang, a con artist who fakes being hit by vehicles and then extorts the drivers for whatever he can get. The poker players contribute money from their winnings to placate him.

A wounded soldier is brought into the hospital, but Frank Burns refuses to operate on him as he is an intelligence (CID) officer; protocol dictates that a second such officer must be present before he can be anesthetized in order to record any confidential information inadvertently revealed by the first. Hawkeye and Trapper decide to operate immediately due to the serious nature of the man's injuries, ignoring Frank's warning that they are violating Army regulations by doing so. Some time after the surgery is over, CID officer Captain Halloran (Edward Winter) eventually arrives from headquarters, and Hawkeye assures him that the wounded man did not give away any secrets. Ignoring Frank's insistence that Hawkeye and Trapper be arrested, Halloran joins the game.

Private Carter (John Ritter), a wounded soldier recovering in Post-Op, rejects a meal and tells Frank that he refuses to go back to the front. Frank threatens to send Carter back that night, but Carter becomes agitated at Frank's gung-ho patriotism. Later that night, the game is interrupted by the sound of gunfire; the shooter is Carter, who has seized a pistol and taken Frank hostage in the shower tent. As Sidney tries to persuade Carter to let Frank go, Trapper sneaks in and subdues him.

The game continues into the night, punctuated one last time by Hwang pretending to be hit by an ambulance as Radar drives through the camp. Hawkeye and Trapper help him up and send him back to Post-Op.

Notes
Generally considered one of the best episodes of the series, "Deal Me Out" marks the first of Edward Winter's eight appearances on M*A*S*H. In all subsequent appearances, he portrayed Intelligence Officer Colonel Flagg.  This first appearance—as Captain Halloran—is often cited by fans as the same character, with Halloran being one of Flagg's many aliases.  In the fourth-season episode "Quo Vadis, Captain Chandler?", Flagg's and Dr. Freedman's conversation refers to a previous poker game that the two had attended.

In "What's Up, Doc?" it is Major Winchester who is taken hostage by an unstable patient, although Klinger soon trades places with Winchester.

Quotes
Klinger: Hi, sirs!  Sandwiches from the Mess Tent!  
Hawkeye: I hope everybody likes carrier pigeon.  
Klinger: There's ham, chicken, and something brown that just lays there.  

Hawkeye: I wonder what the chances are of my getting the 5th Jack?  Oh well, not to worry.
Sidney: Your five, and up five!
Klinger: That's mean!
Sidney: I'm gonna beat the pants off ya, lady!

Halloran: Pierce?  McIntyre?  You two are under arrest!
Henry: Woah!  Hold the phone!  I'm Col. Blake, here.  Nobody arrests them without telling me the whys, the wherefores, or the reason thereofs!
Frank: They operated on a CID man without another CID man standing by!
Halloran: [Introduces himself] Captain Halloran.
Henry: Okay.  Did you guys really do that?
Trapper: Henry, the guy could have died!
Hawkeye: He was bleeding, Henry!  And Frank here, who studied medicine under General Rommel, was too chicken to operate!  He was afraid that under anesthesia, the Lieutenant might give away Harry Truman's hat size!

External links

M*A*S*H (season 2) episodes
1973 American television episodes